Anthony J. O'Connell (May 10, 1938 – May 4, 2012) was an Irish-born prelate of the Roman Catholic church.  He served as the first of the Diocese of Knoxville in Tennessee from 1988 to 1998.  He later served as the third bishop of the Diocese of Palm Beach in Florida from 1999 to 2002. 

O'Connell resigned as bishop of Palm Beach in 2002 after admitting to the sexual abuse of minors years earlier.

Biography

Early life 
O'Connell was born in Lisheen, County Clare, Ireland and studied at Mount St Joseph College in Cork and at Mungret College in Limerick. He emigrated to the U.S. at age 20 and entered Kenrick Seminary in St. Louis, Missouri.

Priesthood 
On March 30, 1963, O'Connell was ordained a priest of the Diocese of Jefferson City, Missouri. Following his ordination, he was assigned as Director of Students at St. Thomas Aquinas Preparatory Seminary in Hannibal, Missouri. He was named Spiritual Director in 1968 and was appointed Rector in 1970.

O'Connell served as Director of Vocations for the Diocese of Jefferson City from 1969 to 1988. He was a member of the Diocesan Commission for Personnel and President of the Priests' Senate. He was serving as Rector of St. Thomas Aquinas Seminary  before becoming bishop.

Bishop of Knoxville 
O'Connell was appointed by Pope John Paul II as the first bishop of the newly created Diocese of Knoxville on June 7, 1988.  On September 8, 1988, O'Connell was consecrated, with Archbishop Pio Laghi served as principal consecrator and Bishop James Niedergeses and Bishop Michael McAuliffe serving as principal co-consecrators.

Bishop of Palm Beach 
On November 12, 1998, John Paul II appointed O'Connell as the third Bishop of the Diocese of Palm Beach, replacing J. Keith Symons, who resigned after admitting he molested five boys early in his priesthood.

Resignation and legacy 
On March 8, 2002, O'Connell admitted that he had molested at least two students of St. Thomas Aquinas Preparatory Seminary during his 25-year career there. That same day, O'Connell offered his resignation as bishop of Palm Beach to the Vatican.  It was accepted by Pope John Paul II on March 13, 2002. After his resignation, O'Connell moved to Mepkin Abbey in Moncks Corner, South Carolina, to live a life of penance and prayer under supervision. 

Later in March, Christopher Dixon, a former priest from Missouri, accused O'Connell of sexually molesting him as a teenage seminarian at St. Thomas when O'Connell was rector of the seminary.  After reporting the abuse in 1995, the Diocese of Jefferson City gave him a $125,000 settlement on condition that he sign a non-disclosure agreement.  That same month, Four former students, including two identified in media reports as "John C.C. Doe" and "Alexander," stepped forward to make allegations in regard to O'Connell's actions against students in his charge. The extent of O'Connell's transgressions was documented by Time magazine on March 22, 2002, noting that "Jefferson City diocese had been receiving complaints about sexual abuse by O'Connell as early as 1967."

Anthony O'Connell died on May 4, 2012, six days before his 74th birthday, at Mepkin Abbey.  His funeral Mass was May 7, 2012, at Mepkin Abbey.

Michael Boyd, a Knoxville native, sued the Diocese of Knoxville on July 18, 2019, claiming that, when altar boy, he was abused by Knoxville priest Xavier Mankel and O'Connell. The diocese settled the suit settled out of court for undisclosed terms, and the diocese admitted no wrongdoing in the settlement.

References

1938 births
2012 deaths
Irish emigrants to the United States
Irish people convicted of child sexual abuse
People from County Clare
Roman Catholic Diocese of Jefferson City
Roman Catholic Diocese of Knoxville
Roman Catholic bishops of Palm Beach
American Roman Catholic clergy of Irish descent
American members of the clergy convicted of crimes
Catholic priests convicted of child sexual abuse
20th-century Roman Catholic bishops in the United States
21st-century Roman Catholic bishops in the United States
Roman Catholic bishops in Tennessee
Violence against men in North America